Gota Fría is the second studio album by English singer-songwriter Beth Rowley. It was released on 29 June 2018 in the UK.

Track listing

References

External links
Official website

2018 albums
Beth Rowley albums
Albums produced by Leo Abrahams